The Singapore Turf Club was founded in 1842 as the Singapore Sporting Club to operate the Serangoon Road Race Course at Farrer Park Field. It is the only horse-racing club in Singapore and is part of the Malayan Racing Association. The first race was held on 23 February 1843 with a prize money of $150.

History 
In 1924, the Club changed its name to the Singapore Turf Club. The Club moved to Bukit Timah in 1933 before relocating to its present location at the Singapore Racecourse at Kranji in 1999. The racecourse is adjacent to Kranji MRT station.

Singapore Turf Club is the only horse racing club and authorised operator for horse racing activities in Singapore. It also operates the Singapore Turf Club Riding Centre (STCRC), a 3-hectare site with world-class riding arenas adjacent to the Singapore Racecourse at Kranji.

Racing 

Racing is staged all year round mostly on weekends, with most race meetings restricted to locally trained horses.  

Since there is no breeding industry in Singapore, all its thoroughbred bloodstock is imported from overseas, primarily from Australia and New Zealand, while some come from other countries like America, Argentina, England, France, Ireland, Japan and South Africa.

Horse owners, made up of both Singaporeans and foreigners, purchase horses and send them to local and expat trainers licensed by Singapore Turf Club.

The pool of jockeys consists mainly of local jockeys, apprentices and expatriate jockeys, whose licences are granted by Singapore Turf Club under MRA rules.

Major Races

Singapore Airlines International Cup and KrisFlyer International Sprint 
The S$3 million Group 1 Singapore Airlines International Cup, was first held in 2000 in conjunction with the opening of the Singapore Racecourse at Kranji. It is held in May, coupled with its sister sprint race, the S$1 million Group 1 KrisFlyer International Sprint run over 1,200m.

Both International Group 1 races were part of the Singapore International Racing Festival. They were opened to horses from around the world and was attended by some of the world's top owners, jockeys and trainers. In 2011, the KrisFlyer became the fourth leg of the Global Sprint Challenge. These races were discontinued in 2016.

Kranji Mile 
The $1 million Group 1 Kranji Mile was first introduced in 2000 and runs 1,600m. It replaced the Queen Elizabeth II Cup as one of the three legs of the Singapore Triple Crown series. Slated as the first leg, Kranji Mile then moved on to Raffles Cup (first ran over 1,800m), leading up to the grand final, the Singapore Gold Cup (first ran over 2,200m). Japanese electronics giant Panasonic came on board to sponsor the race from 2007 until 2017, with a Sakura Day festival held in tandem to celebrate all things Japanese.

In 2018, Kranji Mile was revamped as an invitational race. It is no longer held as the first leg of the Singapore Triple Crown series but is now staged in May.

Kranji Mile has seen 18 local winners until Hong Kong's Southern Legend, trained by Caspar Fownes and ridden by Zac Purton won the race back-to-back in 2018 and 2019, when it was opened to international runners. Kranji Mile was set to be run as an International Group 3 race in 2020, the only race in Singapore accorded this status, but due to the COVID-19 situation around the world, it remains as a local Group 1 race.

Singapore Gold Cup 

The Singapore Gold Cup is one of the most prestigious races on the Singapore racing calendar and is traditionally held at the end of November. Contested on turf, the domestic Group 1 handicap race is now run over a distance of 2,000m and is open to horses aged three and older.

To mark its move from Bukit Timah to Kranji in 1999, Singapore Turf Club raised the prizemoney to $1 million and opened the race to international contenders, but the race returned to domestic status three years later.

Singapore Derby 

The Singapore Derby is the oldest feature race in Singapore, staged on turf and now contested over 1,800m, It is open to four-year-old racehorses only and carries a prize purse of $400,000.

Lion City Cup 

The Lion City Cup was launched in 1974 and is widely considered as Singapore's premier domestic sprint race. It is the only Group 1 feature race on turf. The premier sprint race over 1,200m is open to horses aged three and older.

War Plan's Cup win in 1990 was beamed "live" to Hong Kong and in turn, local racegoers were treated to a telecast of the Hong Kong Derby. At its first edition at Kranji, Superb Effect scored consecutive wins in 2000 and 2001. Two other horses to have won it twice were Zac Spirit (2014 and 2016) and Lim's Cruiser (2017 and 2018).

Singapore's iconic sprinter Rocket Man holds the record for the most number of wins. His name was added to the roll of honour four times with wins recorded consecutively from 2009 to 2012.

Raffles Cup 

Raffles Cup is the first leg of the Singapore Triple Crown series. Previously ran on turf over 1,800m but now dropped to 1,600m, the domestic Group 1 race is open to horses aged three years and older.

Queen Elizabeth II Cup 
On 20 February 1972, Her Majesty, Queen Elizabeth II, together with Prince Philip and Princess Anne, visited the Club for the Queen Elizabeth II Cup during her state visit to the Republic. The Cup race to commemorate her visit ran over 2,200m and offered a prizemoney of $35,000. A 26,000-strong crowd showed up to see the Royal Family.

After 34 years, Queen Elizabeth II paid a second visit to Singapore Turf Club with Prince Philip on 18 March 2006, once again gracing the race named after her. To mark the grand occasion, the Club increased the Queen Elizabeth II Cup prizemoney from $250,000 to $350,000.

Today, together with Raffles Cup, Queen Elizabeth II Cup acts as a lead-up to the Singapore Gold Cup. It runs over 1,800m with a prize purse of $300,000.

Trainer Teh Choon Beng holds the record for most wins – eight (from 1977 to 1997). Jockeys Oo Khuang Liang (1985, 1995 and 1999) and Vlad Duric (2017, 2019 and 2020) have won three times each.

Betting 

Since 7 January 2019, wagering operations on horse racing have been transferred to Singapore Pools. All wagering on both Singapore and simulcast races is operated and administered by Singapore Pools.

Types of bets offered are Win, Place, Forecast, Place Forecast, Tierce, Trio and Quartet.

Events and Entertainment 

Singapore Turf Club resides within the Northern Region, with scenic natural views and vast expanses of greenery, open spaces and biodiversity. The scenic greenery and open spaces evoke a natural, rustic feel that enhances visitors’ sensory experiences and makes it an ideal venue for sports and recreation activities.

The Club has partnered the community to create unique recreational experiences using its unique spaces and facilities. Both leisure and competitive sporting activities have been held at the Club, including past events like open houses, sport fiestas, running, cycling, concerts, as well as night and creative markets like Shilin Night Market, Artbox and Farmer's Market and bazaars.  

The Club leases event spaces for corporate functions and other events, from weddings and luncheons to seminars and conferences.

Over the years, the Club has engaged the community and opened its doors to numerous curated leisure and recreation events that promote social cohesion and inclusion within the community. The Club supported a host of community and social causes, including raising funds through charity races and other community engagement initiatives. A progressive member of the community, the Club continues to tap on its vast and lush landscape to explore innovative and creative ways to engage the community.

Facilities 

Opened on 7 August 1999 following a five-year construction at a cost of $500 million, the Singapore Racecourse at Kranji occupies 124 hectares.

The racetracks were designed with the latest in-turf innovation and technology and the 41 light masts installed around its course enabled the Club to introduce night racing, the first Club from MRA to do so.

The five-storey Grandstand can accommodate up to 30,000 race goers, with a seating capacity of about 13,000 people.

It encloses public food courts, private boxes with dining and viewing facilities and private dining areas.

The main features of the Grandstand are its uniquely shaped roof which characterises a horse at full stretch, and the imposing façade featuring floor-to-ceiling glass panels that provide an unobstructed vista of the track to visitors.

The LED Astrovision screen, measuring 46m by 8m, is one of the largest outdoor screens in the world. The screen displays vivid racing action in multi-angles and comprehensive racing and totalisator information.

The stables feature over 1,000 stalls and training facilities include an equine swimming pool, treadmills, horse walkers and a total of seven tracks of turf, poly and sand. The latest addition to the tracks was a 1,000m long uphill track (Polytrack) completed in February 2010. Taking into account Singapore's wet weather, all tracks utilise an underground drainage system which minimises waterlogging by draining off the rainwater to maintain a safe racing surface at all times.

The Club also operates Singapore's only equine veterinary hospital. The Singapore Turf Club Veterinary Hospital is a modern, fully equipped facility and is staffed by qualified and experienced Equine Veterinary surgeons, including a number of registered specialists.

The Club manages the only equine quarantine facility in Singapore for the importation of horses, a 2.9ha equine quarantine station at Neo Tiew Road. Newly imported horses undergo a minimum of 14 days quarantine where they will be tested, vaccinated and monitored to be clinically free of diseases before being released.

Riding Centre 

The Singapore Turf Club Riding Centre (STCRC) is a community project by Tote Board and Singapore Turf Club. Built adjacent to Singapore Turf Club and opened in November 2009, STCRC aims to develop the horse-riding community in Singapore. It seeks to introduce and educate the public about horses and horse care through different programmes and activities for all.

STCRC is a mix of both modern architecture and abundant fauna and flora. It is kept green and lush to provide plenty of turn out and paddock facilities. Set on 3 hectares of lush greenery, STCRC features the most advanced riding facilities in Singapore with two world-class riding arenas – a 100m by 50m open arena and an 80m by 50m sheltered arena – which can accommodate all events and weather conditions. The viewing gallery seats up to 250.

Quality horse care is provided by trained veterinarians and a world class equine medical facility.

The modern administration building features comfortable classrooms where lessons on core subjects such as stable management and the care of horses are taught.

The STCRC Arena was purpose-built in 2010 to host the Equestrian Jumping event for the inaugural Youth Olympic Games in Singapore.

STCRC also provides opportunities for riders who do not own horses to compete in equestrian sports. A youth squad was started in 2011 with four young riders who proceeded to win competitions in Singapore and Malaysia and a dressage squad in 2013.

With its world-class facility, STCRC regularly hosts FEI dressage and jumping competitions and other competitions for the riding community in Singapore. Riders from STCRC have regularly won in many of such regional and local competitions.

Corporate Social Responsibility (CSR) 

Singapore Turf Club is a proprietary club of the Tote Board. Through the aegis of the Tote Board, it supports a host of community and social initiatives that "enable communities to progress, promote social cohesiveness, and create value in the community".

In addition to contributions from Tote Board, the Club opens its doors for open house events and makes available its offsite premises for community usage. The Club also organises charity races and provides a platform for organisations to raise funds.

Sponsorships 

Various companies act as sponsors to some feature races in Singapore, including Singapore Airlines (Singapore Airlines International Cup and KrisFlyer International Sprint), Longines (Singapore Gold Cup), Emirates Airline (Singapore Derby), Panasonic (Kranji Mile) and Magic Millions, Inglis, Aushorse and IRT (Singapore Golden Horseshoe series) and Japan Bloodhorse Breeders’ Association (Moonbeam Vase) among others.

See also
Singapore Pools

References

External links
 

Horse racing organizations
1842 establishments in the Straits Settlements
Turf Club
Venues of the 2010 Summer Youth Olympics
19th-century architecture in Singapore